Shirju Posht Rural District is a rural district (dehestan) in Rudboneh District, Lahijan County, Gilan Province, Iran. At the 2006 census, its population was 15,716, in 4,711 families. The rural district has 29 villages.

References 

Rural Districts of Gilan Province
Lahijan County